Longchuan County (postal: Lungchun; , Hakka: Liùngchôn) is a county of northeastern Guangdong province, China, bordering Jiangxi to the north and on the upper reaches of the Dong and Han Rivers. Bordering county-level divisions are Xingning and Wuhua County to the east, Heping County and Dongyuan County to the south and west, and in Jiangxi, Dingnan County and Xunwu County to the north.

Administrative divisions

Longchuan administers 24 towns:

Laolong
Sidu
Huangshi
Xi'ao
Chetian
Beiling
Liju
Shanping
Fengren
Chiguang
Longmu
Huilong
Tianxin
Tiechang
Dengyun
Tongqu
Heshi
Huangbu
Zishi
Tuocheng
Yanzhen
Xintian
Yidu
Mabugang

Transport

Longchuan has a developed highway and railway network. Major roads include the China National Highway 205 (G205) and Guangdong Provincial Highway 120 (S120). The Beijing–Kowloon, Guangzhou–Meizhou–Shantou and Zhangping–Longchuan Railways intersect in Longchuan, making it an important railway hub for the Lingnan region.

Sights

Climate

See also
Cowhells cake, a local specialty

References

County-level divisions of Guangdong
Heyuan